Craugastor mexicanus is a species of frog in the family Craugastoridae. It is endemic to eastern Mexico and occurs in the states of Oaxaca, Puebla, Hidalgo, and Veracruz. Although it is adaptable to habitat disturbance, loss of cloud forest is a potential threat to it. Also chytridiomycosis can have negative impacts. It is present in a number of protected areas, including Cofre de Perote National Park, Tehuacán-Cuicatlán Biosphere Reserve, and Cuenca Hidrográfica Río Necaxa.

References

mexicanus
Frogs of North America
Endemic amphibians of Mexico
Amphibians described in 1877
Taxa named by Paul Brocchi
Taxonomy articles created by Polbot